Pierre Caland (born 10 September 1956) is a French former freestyle swimmer. He competed in two events at the 1972 Summer Olympics.

References

External links
 

1956 births
Living people
French male freestyle swimmers
Olympic swimmers of France
Swimmers at the 1972 Summer Olympics
Place of birth missing (living people)